Crofton may refer to:

People
 Crofton (surname)
 Baron Crofton, a title in the Peerage of Ireland
 Crofton baronets, a title in the Baronetage on the United Kingdom  
 Crofton family, Noble family

Places

Canada
 Crofton, British Columbia, a town in the province of British Columbia, Canada
 Crofton House School

New Zealand
 Crofton Downs

United Kingdom
 Crofton, Cumbria, in Thursby Parish
 Crofton, London, a neighbourhood in Orpington
 Crofton, Hampshire, an area of Stubbington
 Crofton, West Yorkshire a village near Wakefield
 Crofton TMD, a traction maintenance depot at Crofton, West Yorkshire
 Crofton Pumping Station in the county of Wiltshire
 Crofton Locks in the county of Wiltshire
 Crofton Park, south east London

United States
 Crofton, Kentucky
 Crofton, Maryland
 Crofton, Nebraska

Other uses
Crofton formula
 Crofton weed (Ageratina adenophora), a noxious weed, native to Mexico

See also